Mexinauta is a genus of small, left-handed or sinistral, air-breathing freshwater snails, aquatic pulmonate gastropod mollusks in the subfamily Aplexinae of the family Physidae.

Species
 Mexinauta aurantius (Carpenter, 1857)
 Mexinauta gracilentus (P. Fischer & Crosse, 1886)
 Mexinauta impluviatus (Morelet, 1849)
 Mexinauta laetus (E. von Martens, 1898)
 Mexinauta nicaraguanus (Morelet, 1851)
 Mexinauta nitens (Philippi, 1841)
 Mexinauta peruvianus (Gray, 1828)
 Mexinauta princeps (Phillips, 1846)
Synonyms
 Mexinauta aurantia (Carpenter, 1857): synonym of Mexinauta aurantius (Carpenter, 1857) (wrong gender agreement of specific epithet; Mexinauta is masculine")

References

External links
 
 Taylor, D. W. (2003). Introduction to Physidae (Gastropoda: Hygrophila); biogeography, classification, morphology. Revista de Biología Tropical. 51(Suppl. 1): 1-263 (includes a Catalog of species, pp. 197-263)

Physidae